James Madison Bell (April 3, 1826 – March 4, 1902) was an African-American poet, orator, and political activist who was involved in the abolitionist movement against slavery. He was the first native African-American poet in Ohio and was called the "Bard of the Maumee," of Maumee River. According to Joan R. Sherman: "As poet and public speaker, Bell was one of the nineteenth century's most dedicated propagandists for African-American freedom and civil rights."

Early life 

Bell was born free in Gallipolis, Ohio, on April 3, 1826.  Bell attended a school for black children that was run by Elisha Barnes in the Bethel Church (later the African Methodist Episcopal Chapel). He lived with his parents until he was 16 years of age.

When he was a boy, Ohio was a free state.  "Black laws" passed by the Ohio General Assembly in 1804 and 1807 required African Americans to provide proof that they were free and a $500 bond to show that they could support themselves.

Cincinnati 
In 1842, he moved to Cincinnati, where he lived with his brother-in-law George Knight and worked as a plasterer. He worked 12- to 14-hour days, and in the evenings, he attended Cincinnati High School for Colored People The school was established by Reverend Hiram S. Gilmore in 1844 and it had well-trained teachers who taught English, Greek, Latin, music, and drawing. The students were taught in a proper school building with classrooms and a chapel. The school had a connection to Oberlin College. Bell was initiated to radical anti-slavery viewpoints at the school.

Cincinnati was on the northern border of the Mason–Dixon line and an important stop on the Underground Railroad. He helped fugitive slaves make their way north through the city. He wrote poetry about ways to improve the life of African Americans, and particularly those who were enslaved. His anti-slavery poems and speeches became popular. He also wrote about the need for educational opportunities and civil rights. He read his poetry and gave lectures in Cincinnati, but his income was mainly derived from plastering.

Bell married Louisiana Sanderlin on November 9, 1847 and they had seven children. Concerned about his safety and that of his family, Bell and his family moved in 1854 to Chatham in Canada, which was one of the final stops on the Underground Railroad in Canada.

Chatham
At the time that Bell decided to go to Canada, he thought he would have better opportunities under the British government than in the United States. The Dred Scott v. Sandford case made it to the Supreme Court of the United States in 1854, which found that American citizenship was not guaranteed for free blacks. He and his family were among and estimated 30,000 people who made it through the United States and into Canada by the 1850s. Many people made it to Chatham, North Buxton, and Dresden in Ontario, where there were a number of trades and businesses that led to a thriving community: education, business, literary and cultural arts, medicine and sport. The industries included a brickyard, gristmill, blacksmith, shoe factory, potash factory, and pearl ash facility. By 1850, one third of the population of Chatham were African Americans. Neighboring towns, Buxton and Dresden, had settlements for African Americans, Elgin Settlement and Dawn Settlement. The number grew as word travelled about the success of the settlements. He earned a living as a plasterer, and he further developed his viewpoints on abolitionism, civil rights, and politics while in Canada.

He became friends with John Brown and supported his raid on Harpers Ferry in 1859. He helped identify men who would assist Brown, and helped raise funds for the raid. He was the secretary of the Chatham Vigilance Committee, a group that included Oberlin College graduates, who rescued Sylvanus Demerest who was kidnapped with the intention of selling him into slavery. Bell stayed in Canada until 1860, when he moved to California; His family stayed in Ontario until the end of the Civil War, after which Bell brought them to Toledo.

California, Ohio and other states 

In 1860, Bell moved to San Francisco where he continued activism and wrote poetry about abolition. He met leaders who were interested in developing ways to lift up African Americans so that they could thrive. Some of the leaders where people who he met or were introduced to him following his years in Chatham, like John J. Moore of the AME Zion Church and Mary Ellen Pleasant also called Mammie Pleasant, and David W. Ruggles. Other leaders included Philip Alexander Bell, the editor of Pacific Appeal; Darius Stokes; T. M. D. Ward; J. B. Sanderson; Richard Hall; and F. G. Barbados. Bell participated in an African Episcopal Methodist Church convention led by its ministers, where Rev. James Hubbard spoke to the pioneers who fled to California for their freedom. Another was held in San Francisco on September 3, 1863, where he was a steward for the San Francisco ministry. Bell was on the committee on finance and ministry, which resulted in the key note for ministerial education.  The group of leaders were “pioneer urbanites” who led a movement for black press, churches, schools, and began the convention movement. He became involved fighting state laws against African Americans and advocate for education for black children.

"Emancipation", "The Dawn of Freedom" and "Lincoln" were poems that Bell wrote in California. He left San Francisco after five years and lived in a number of states around the country. Over that time, he worked as a poet-lecturer and a plasterer.

In January 1864, he attended a celebration for the first anniversary of the Emancipation Proclamation in Cincinnati. He read "The Day and the War" at Platt's Hall, dedicating the poem to John Brown, whom he called "The Hero, Saint and Martyr of Harpers Ferry." His most famous poem describes the significance of the Battle of Milliken's Bend, the first battle that African-American soldiers fought in the war. They fought heroically. The soldier's dedication changed the perception among the military and civilian northerners that in fact blacks did make good fighters; They encouraged more than 150,000 black men to enlist in the Union Army and they earned the respect of the Union.

Bell moved to Toledo, Ohio, in 1865. He then lived in other places, all the while continuing to plaster and give lectures. He expressed his impressions about the "history of slavery, the Civil War, emancipation, and the Reconstruction era" in long verse-orations, often between 750 to 950 lines. Although about a dozen of his poems were short, like the satire, "Modern Moses, or 'My Policy'" Man about President Andrew Johnson. Some of his most appreciated poems were "Lincoln", "Emancipation", "The Dawn of Freedom", and "The Future of America in the Unity of Races, Valedictory of Leaving San Francisco, Song for the First of August". Through his verses, he advised freedmen on their rights and duties as a citizen, human liberty, and to be responsible as free people. According to William Wells Brown, he delivered "soul-stirring appeal" befitting the subjects of his prose and bringing the words on the printed page to life. His audience members had inspired "enthusiasm of admiration". Rev. Benjamin W. Arnett, a friend from church, often traveled with Bell on the lecture tour. Arnett said of his audience members: "Many a young man who was not an honor to his race and a blessing to his people received the first spark of inspiration for true greatness."

He was an active member and lay person for the African Methodist Episcopal Church (AME). He was also superintendent of an AME Church Sunday School from 1870 to 1873 when the church as led by Rev. Arnett. President Chester A. Arthur received leaders of the AME Church, which included James Madison Bell,  at the White House in 1884.

In 1868 and 1872, he was elected as a delegate for the state and national Republican conventions, standing firmly for Ulysses S. Grant for both elections.  In 1901, he published a book of poetry, Poetical Works.

Later life 
His wife and oldest son may have died in 1874. Bell died in Chicago on March 4, 1902, at the home of his son, Andrew Bell. At that time, his wife and four of their children had died.

Works and publications

Poems
 A Poem (1862)
 The Day and the War (1864)
 Poem (about the assassination of Lincoln, 1865)
 Valedictory on Leaving San Francisco (1866)
 The Progress of Liberty (1866)
 Modern Moses (1866)
 The Triumph of Liberty (1870)

Publications

Notes

References

Further reading
 
 
 

1826 births
1902 deaths
19th-century American male writers
19th-century American non-fiction writers
19th-century American poets
Activists for African-American civil rights
African-American Methodists
African-American poets
African-American suffragists
American suffragists
American male journalists
American male non-fiction writers
Lecturers
Methodist abolitionists
People from Cincinnati
People from Gallipolis, Ohio
People of the African Methodist Episcopal church
Public speaking